Álvaro Fernández Carreras (born 23 March 2003) is a Spanish professional footballer who plays as a left-back for Championship club Preston North End, on loan from Premier League club Manchester United.

Club career
Born in Ferrol, Fernández started his career with Galicia de Caranza, Racing de Ferrol and Deportivo de La Coruña, before joining Real Madrid in 2017.

Manchester United
Fernández signed for Manchester United from Real Madrid in September 2020 on a four-year contract, amid interest from other European clubs such as Barcelona and Manchester City. He began training with the first team during the early stages of the 2021–22 season.

Fernández was a regular for the under-23 team in his first season at Manchester United, making 20 league appearances and one in the EFL Trophy, as well as seven for the under-18s, and two in the FA Youth Cup. He then played 21 times in the league in 2021–22, all as a starter, as well as playing in all three EFL Trophy matches and six of the seven in the UEFA Youth League. He received his first call-up to the Manchester United first team in April 2022, when he was named on the bench for the Premier League match at home to Chelsea. He was also named on the bench against Brighton & Hove Albion.

On 11 May 2022, Fernández was named Manchester United's U23 Player of the Year.

Preston North End (loan)
On 26 July 2022, Fernández joined EFL Championship club Preston North End on loan for the duration of the 2022–23 season. Fernández made his debut on 30 July 2022, coming on as a 72nd-minute substitute for Robbie Brady in a 0–0 draw away at Wigan Athletic.

International career
Fernández played twice for the Spain under-19 team. He made his debut for the side on 26 October 2021, when he started in a friendly match against Israel.

Career statistics

Honours

 Denzil Haroun Reserve Player of the Year: 2021–22

References

2003 births
Living people
Footballers from Mallorca
Spanish footballers
Spain youth international footballers
Association football defenders
Racing de Ferrol footballers
Deportivo de La Coruña players
Real Madrid CF players
Manchester United F.C. players
Preston North End F.C. players
Spanish expatriate footballers
Spanish expatriate sportspeople in England
Expatriate footballers in England
English Football League players